The Mikonui River is a river of the West Coast Region of New Zealand's South Island. It flows northwest from its sources in the Southern Alps, reaching the Tasman Sea close to the township of Ross.

Early settlers on the Mikonui
Charles Shearer (born 1826 in Denny, Scotland) and his wife Janet (born Costdyke, Scotland) settled in Mikonui in 1868. In 1881 Charles advertised his Mikonui River water-race for sale in the West Coast Times for two hundred pounds.

See also
List of rivers of New Zealand

References

Goa Way Back, Early Hari Hari - Vic Berry, Published 1986

Paperspast

External links 
 1918 photo of tram at opening of Mikonui River bridge

Rivers of the West Coast, New Zealand
Rivers of New Zealand
Westland District